The 1965–66 international cricket season was from September 1965 to April 1966.

Season overview

December

England in Australia

February

England in New Zealand

April

Ceylon in India

References

International cricket competitions by season
1965 in cricket
1966 in cricket